Abarema cochleata var. moniliformis is a vulnerable variety of legume, which is endemic to the forests of Manaus, Brazil.

References

cochleata var moniliformis
Endemic flora of Brazil